Blepephaeus stigmosus is a species of beetle in the family Cerambycidae. It was described by Charles Joseph Gahan in 1895. It is known from Malaysia, Laos, and Myanmar. It contains the varietas Blepephaeus stigmosus var. laosensis.

References

Blepephaeus
Beetles described in 1895